Cabin Ghosts is the 2008 EP by Cory Chisel and The Wandering Sons. It was recorded mostly live at Robinwood, his family's cabin in the wilds of Elco, Wisconsin, and at a live concert in his hometown of Appleton, Wisconsin.

Track listing

2008 EPs
Cory Chisel and The Wandering Sons albums